USS Vedette has been the name of more than one United States Navy ship, and may refer to:

, a yacht in commission as a patrol vessel from 1917 to 1919
, a motorboat acquired in 1917 or 1918 and in service as a patrol boat until December 1918

United States Navy ship names